Rafał Hejmej (born 15 July 1980) is a Polish rower. He competed at the 2004, 2008 and 2012 Summer Olympics.

References

1980 births
Living people
Polish male rowers
Olympic rowers of Poland
Rowers at the 2004 Summer Olympics
Rowers at the 2008 Summer Olympics
Rowers at the 2012 Summer Olympics
Sportspeople from Bydgoszcz
European Rowing Championships medalists